Patrice Tano (born 22 September 1982) is a former professional footballer who played as a striker.

Tano began his career at Monaco, before moving to English club Southampton in 2000. He later moved to Belgian side Mechelen, and then Dutch club Telstar. He had a trial with English side Colchester United in 2002 prior to signing a non-contract agreement, and then had a similar arrangement with Scottish club Falkirk.

Career
Born in Ivory Coast and a French passport holder, Tano began his career with Monaco. He joined Premier League side Southampton in July 2000 after he was recommended to the club by Hassan Kachloul, while Tano was advised by former Monaco teammate Thierry Henry. He signed a four-year deal with the Saints.

Tano left Southampton after just four months in England, moving to Belgian side Mechelen in November 2000. He then moved to the Netherlands to play for Telstar in July 2001. In February 2002, he joined English Second Division club Colchester United, initially on trial. However, he left the club in early March failing to make an appearance.

In March 2002, Tano joined up with Scottish First Division side Falkirk, initially on trial. He made his debut for Falkirk in their 2–2 draw against Airdrieonians on 23 March as a substitute. He made six appearances in total for Falkirk without scoring.

References

External links

1982 births
Living people
French sportspeople of Ivorian descent
Ivorian footballers
French footballers
Association football forwards
AS Monaco FC players
Southampton F.C. players
K.V. Mechelen players
SC Telstar players
Colchester United F.C. players
Falkirk F.C. players
Scottish Football League players